The Wieringerrandmeer or bordering lake of Wieringen is a project of the Dutch province of North Holland and the (former) municipalities of Wieringen and Wieringermeer. (Since 2012 both are part of the new municipality of Hollands Kroon.) It is intended to create islands and a bordering lake. The project was cancelled in 2010 by the provincial and national governments.

History
Wieringen has been connected to the mainland since 1932. 24. This land is used, among other things, for housing and agriculture. In the mid-90s, Wieringen initiated a project to restore its insular character by creating a bordering lake between North Holland and the polder Wieringermeer. The authorities of North Holland agreed.

The Wieringerrandmeer was to be part of an ensemble including the Amstelmeer, the IJsselmeer and the Wadden Sea. The province of North Holland and others united in support of Wieringerrandmeer. It was intended to "boost economic and social development" by stimulating business and creating a recreational lake. The project's slogan was "the Experience of the lake."

Development
In 2003, the province of North Holland, the various municipalities, and the Water Board of the Netherlands published a contest for a development project for the region. Five consortia attended. The winner Wirense consists of Volker Wessels and Boskalis, which  could participate in the project and take joint responsibility. The governments and the selected consortium drafted a Memorandum of Understanding for cooperation. On March 5, 2007, the public-private partnership (PPP) between the government (provincial and municipal) and operators (Boskalis, Volker Wessels) for the construction of Wieringerrandmeer ended. Subsequently, the planning and preparations will be processed in more detail. On December 19th, 2007, the executive of North Holland approved the project.

The project was approved by the Steering Committee Wieringerrandmeer: the province, municipalities, and Wirense group. The National Forest areas and the water board will be involved.

Planning
According to the original schedule, the physical construction was scheduled to begin in summer 2010. It was expected to create the lake in five years, but the work could last until around 2030, when all the objectives would be met.

Nature
With the construction of Wieringerrandmeer, continuity could be established between the IJsselmeer and Amstelmeer as far as forests, water bodies and reedbeds are concerned. This continuity of natural parts of the provincial ecological structure, was called the Northern Arc.

Facts
The total area of 1600 ha is planned, including 250 ha for housing. 
The total surface area of water is about 860 ha. 
The total area of over 400 hectares of new nature. 
128 ha of forest plantations with new surrounding residential areas.

Opposition and alternatives
Not everyone was enthusiastic about the project Wieringerrandmeer. Thirty farms in Wieringen and Wieringermeer would be closed. Farmers would often be forced to move away. Municipalities and counties said that the future of agriculture in this region was uncertain, but farmers were skeptical of that assessment. The project would alter the region's water balance and likely have an adverse effect on agricultural land.

One June 27, 2008 The other Wieringerrandmeer presented an alternative plan developed among residents and farmers who were part of environmental organizations. They proposed reducing the area to be flooded, building fewer homes that would be located closer to the lake, and requiring fewer farms to relocate. Some luxury items, such as the creation of the Zuiderhaven lock between the Amstelmeer and the IJsselmeer, were removed from the project. Discussions concluded that it is not necessary to build a large lake on the edge of North-Holland.

The final decision
On November 3, 2010 the Gedeputeerde staten of North Holland cancelled the project for financial reasons; on November 15 the States-Provincial of the Netherlands confirmed the decision.

External links
 Website van het Wieringerrandmeerproject

References

Cancelled projects
Coastal construction
Environmental soil science
Freshwater ecology
Hollands Kroon
Polders of North Holland
Zuiderzee Works